Parliamentary elections were held in Colombia on 15 March 1964 to elect the Chamber of Representatives. Under the National Front agreement, only the Conservative Party and the Liberal Party were able to contest the elections, with 50% of the seats in both houses allocated to each party. As a result, the main contest at the elections was between factions within each party.

Results

References

Parliamentary elections in Colombia
Colombia
1964 in Colombia